Boissey may refer to several communes in France:

 Boissey, Ain
 Boissey, Calvados
 Boissey-le-Châtel

See also 
 Boisset (disambiguation)